The United Nations Educational, Scientific and Cultural Organization (UNESCO) World Heritage Sites are places of importance to cultural or natural heritage as described in the UNESCO World Heritage Convention, established in 1972. The Caribbean island-nation of Cuba accepted the convention on March 24, 1981, making its historical sites eligible for inclusion on the list; as of 2011, nine sites in Cuba are included.

Cuba had its first site included on the list at the 6th Session of World Heritage Committee, held at UNESCO headquarters in Paris, France, in December 1982. At that session, "Old Havana and its Fortifications", a site including the central, historic portion of the Cuban capital of Havana, as well as Spanish colonial fortifications, was inscribed on the list.

Cuba's inclusions on the list include a variety of sites. Two sites are selected for their natural significance: Alejandro de Humboldt National Park in the eastern provinces of Holguín and Guantánamo, and Desembarco del Granma National Park, named for the yacht which carried the members of the 26th of July Movement who started the Cuban Revolution. City landscapes include Old Havana, Trinidad, and Camagüey, all founded by early Spanish colonists in the 16th century. The sites also include historical agricultural regions, including the coffee plantations of southeastern Cuba, and the tobacco region of Viñales Valley.

List of sites
The table lists information about each World Heritage Site:
Name: as listed by the World Heritage Committee
Region: of the 15 provinces of Cuba
Period: time period of significance, typically of construction
UNESCO data: the site's reference number; the year the site was inscribed on the World Heritage List; the criteria it was listed under: criteria (i) through (vi) are cultural, while (vii) through (x) are natural; sites meeting both criteria are categorized as "mixed sites", the column sorts by year.
Description: brief description of the site

Tentative list
In addition to sites inscribed on the World Heritage list, member states can maintain a list of tentative sites that they may consider for nomination. Nominations for the World Heritage list are only accepted if the site was previously listed on the tentative list. As of 2011, Cuba listed three sites on its tentative list:

Notes
1.  Isla de la Juventud is defined as a special municipality rather than a province. On January 1, 2011,  La Habana Province was divided into Artemisa and Mayabeque, and "Ciudad de La Habana" is now referred to as La Habana province.

References

 
Cuba
World Heritage Sites
World Heritage Sites